The Oran Exposition was a French colonial exposition held in Oran, Algeria in 1930 to help celebrate the 100th anniversary of French control over Algeria.

References

External links
 

1930 in Algeria
Oran
1930 festivals
French Algeria
World's fairs in Africa